James Darron Cox (born November 21, 1967) is an American former Major League Baseball catcher who played 15 games for the Montreal Expos in the  season.

Biography
A native of Oklahoma City, Oklahoma, Cox attended Mustang High School and the University of Oklahoma. In 1987, he played collegiate summer baseball with the Harwich Mariners of the Cape Cod Baseball League, and returned to the league the following season when he was named a league all-star for the Wareham Gatemen.

Cox was selected by the Cincinnati Reds in the fifth round of the 1989 MLB Draft. After spending several seasons in the minor leagues, he signed with the Montreal Expos as a free agent in 1999. In his lone major league season, Cox posted six hits in 25 at-bats, with one home run and two RBIs over 15 games for Montreal.

References

External links

1967 births
Living people
American expatriate baseball players in Canada
American expatriate baseball players in Mexico
Baseball players from Oklahoma
Billings Mustangs players
Cedar Rapids Reds players
Chattanooga Lookouts players
Charleston Wheelers players
Colorado Springs Sky Sox players
Durham Bulls players
Harwich Mariners players
Iowa Cubs players
Major League Baseball catchers
Montreal Expos players
Oklahoma Sooners baseball players
Orlando Cubs players
Orlando Rays players
Ottawa Lynx players
Richmond Braves players
Sportspeople from Oklahoma City
Tigres del México players
Wareham Gatemen players